The Portrait of Giovanni Carlo Doria on horseback is a 1606 painting by Peter Paul Rubens. It shows its subject (son of doge Agostino Doria) aged 30. It is now held in the Galleria Nazionale di Palazzo Spinola in Genoa. It was moved to Naples in 1940 and acquired by Adolf Hitler on the suggestion of Benito Mussolini, before being returned to Italy at the end of World War Two.

External links
Arte.it: Portrait of Giovanni Carlo Doria on Horseback—

Portraits by Peter Paul Rubens
Portraits of men
Equestrian portraits
Portrait of Giovanni Carlo Doria on Horseback
17th-century portraits
Portrait of Giovanni Carlo Doria on Horseback